The Ulster-Scots Folk Orchestra (Ulster-Scots: Ulstèr-Scotch Fowk Orchéstrà) is a Northern Irish band of musicians who perform music from the Ulster-Scots tradition. Formed in 2000, the USFO are part of a wider revival of interest in Ulster-Scots language and culture that developed during the 1990s. They draw on long established practices of community music-making, including gospel-singing, fiddling, piping, flute and accordion bands, drumming and fifing. Combining these traditions in innovative ways, they produce sounds that are both new and distinctive. Their focus on the local is complemented by the creative use of related traditions in Scotland, Ireland and the Scotch-Irish diaspora in North America.

History
The Ulster-Scots Folk Orchestra had its roots in Fowkgates (Ulster-Scots for "Culture"), an artists' collective which was founded by Willie Drennan in 1999 to promote the Ulster-Scots tradition. Following the success of initial recordings issued by Fowkgates, the Orchestra was formed in October 2000. Their arrival was announced by a major concert in the Ulster Hall in early 2001. In the spring of the same year, they travelled to Atlanta to perform at a Scotch-Irish Symposium at Emory University. 
 
Following their return to Ireland, they took part in an ethnomusicological workshop at the Irish World Music Centre at the University of Limerick in June 2001, including concert performances in the area which received a very positive response. 

The USFO brought out their first album Planet Ulster later in 2001. Following its success, the second album Endangered Species was released the following year. 

In 2004 the USFO visited Kentucky bringing their music to schools and colleges and re-establishing the cultural links between Ulster and the Bluegrass State. On their return to Ulster, their third album Bringin It Thegither was released. The fourth album, Somme was released in 2006 to coincide with the 90th anniversary of the Battle of the Somme.

As the Orchestra has developed, it has grown into a large network of musicians, who come together in different combinations for different occasions. Although the name "orchestra" was deliberately chosen to suggest the size and diversity of instruments involved, in many ways the USFO is an "anti-orchestra"; it operates as a loosely coordinated network of creative individuals, rather than in the tightly structured and hierarchical manner of a classical orchestra, and founder member John Trotter is scornful of the 'orchestralisation' of traditional music that has become common in commercialised recordings.

The break away Ulster Scots eXperience group formed in July 2005 including John Trotter.

Live
The USFO has performed at a variety of venues, ranging from small community halls to outdoor festivals, and major venues such as the Ulster Hall and Waterfront Hall where they were part of an Ulster-Scots programme for the BBC in 2004. They have also performed in Scotland, England, Ireland and the United States. Performances cover a wide range of material from Ulster-Scots language recitation and unaccompanied songs to contemporary songs accompanied by guitar and other instruments, to drum and fife tunes from both Orange and Hibernian sources, including the many shared tunes, to dance music played on a variety of instruments in both Ulster-Scots and Appalachian styles, as well as various, sometimes unexpected combinations of these. The USFO also provide structured stage performances and workshops which they take into schools, community centres and festivals.

The USFO is now very well established within Ulster-Scots communities, playing upwards of 80 gigs a year, and believe that maintaining this rootedness in the communities from which their musical practices come is vital. They believe that they have now reached a point, however, where they need to bring their sound, and the culture it is a part of, to a wider audience, both within Britain and Ireland, and internationally.

Influences
The USFO were inspired by The Boys o Soorhill, a group of local traditional musicians active in the 1970s and 80s. The album Endangered Species is dedicated to The Boys o Soorhill.

USFO Youth Project
In 2004 the USFO Youth Project was initiated with the purpose of bringing young talent into the group. The growth of the orchestra into a widespread network has been manifested in its organisation by the creation in 2004 of The Ulster-Scots Folk Orchestra Association, to bring together al those performing, or interested in performing in the USFO and the various smaller groups associated with it. The association meets regularly for informal rehearsals in a loft in a farm near Ballymena – occasions that are both preparations for gigging and an opportunity to gather for the sheer pleasure of playing music together. The energy that is generated on these occasions carries over into the group's public performances and forms a major part of their appeal.

Other projects
The USFO not only performs as an orchestra, but also in smaller ensembles tailored to specific kinds of venue. Clatter o Fowk is a varied ensemble including lambeg and other drums, that produces a similar sound to the orchestra on a smaller scale. Rhythms o Ulster is a drum and fife ensemble that performs primarily in parading contexts, most recently at the St. Patrick's Day Parade in Ballina, County Mayo. A recent venture is a dance band called Nae Goat's Toe.

Discography
 Planet Ulster (2001)
 Endangered Species (2002)
 Bringin It Thegither (2004)
 Somme (2006)

References

External links
Willie Drennan
Ulster-Scots Folk Orchestra Video clips
Ulster-Scots Folk Orchestra official site
Ulster-Scots experience official site
The Ulster-Scots Folk Orchestra – An Ethnomusicological Study
Ulster Scots Folk Orchestra at tradmusic.com

Musical groups from Northern Ireland
Orchestras in Northern Ireland